Madame Sidibé Korian Sidibé is a Deputy in the National Assembly of Mali and a member of the Pan-African Parliament. The other Malian members of the Pan-African Parliament are Ibrahim Boubacar Keïta, Mountaga Tall, and Ascofare Oulematou Tamboura.

References

External links
Member of the Pan-African Parliament

Members of the Pan-African Parliament from Mali
Members of the National Assembly (Mali)
Year of birth missing (living people)
Living people
21st-century Malian people